Last Night (translit. Al-Laylah al-Akheera) is a 1964 Egyptian mystery film directed by Kamal El Sheikh. It was entered into the 1964 Cannes Film Festival.

Cast
 Faten Hamama - Nadia and her sister Fawzya
 Ahmed Mazhar - Dr. Ahmed
 Mahmoud Moursy - Shoukry
 Madiha Salem - Daughter of Nadia
 Abdel Khalek Saleh

References

External links

1964 films
1960s Arabic-language films
Egyptian black-and-white films
1960s mystery films
Films directed by Kamal El Sheikh
Egyptian mystery films